Daniel Casey (born November 15, 1981) is an American screenwriter best known as the writer of the 2018 film Kin and the 2021 installment in the Fast & Furious franchise, F9.

Early life 
Casey grew up in Royal Oak, Michigan. He graduated from George A. Dondero High School before attending the College for Creative Studies in Detroit, Michigan where he earned his BFA in digital cinema and received his MFA in Film Directing from the American Film Institute, where he was the recipient of the Tom Yoda Scholarship Award. Casey with his film Poletown was selected as one of 13 projects to participate in the annual Sundance Institute's June Directors and Screenwriters Labs, held at the Sundance Resort in Utah.

Career 
Casey replaced Chris Morgan in writing the screenplay for the latest installment in the Fast & Furious franchise, F9, which was released on June 25, 2021.

He has been selected to work on Sony's adaptation of the comic, Incognito, by Ed Brubaker. Fede Álvarez is set to direct.

He is also attached to another comic book adaptation for the big screen from Brubaker, Kill or Be Killed. It will be directed by Chad Stahelski.

J. J. Abrams' Bad Robot Productions is producing Casey's script The Heavy for Paramount. The superhero movie is in negotiations with Overlord director Julius Avery to direct.

Blumhouse Productions is rumored to be remaking The Craft. Casey is tied to the project with fellow writer Zoe Lister-Jones. Lister-Jones has also been rumored to direct.

It was announced in July 2021 that he has been selected by the Russo Brothers to write the script for the movie adaptation of the popular anime cartoon Battle of the Planets.

Personal life 
Casey currently resides in Los Angeles, California.

Filmography

Film 

Special Thanks
 Deadheads (2011)

Television 
Writer
 Dr0ne (2012) (1 episode)

Editor
 Chosen (2013) (6 episodes)

Awards and nominations

References

External links 
 
 

Living people
1981 births
American male screenwriters